Shawnee Mission West High School is a fully accredited public high school located in Overland Park, Kansas, United States, serving students in grades 9-12. Shawnee Mission West is one of several public high schools located within Overland Park and operated by Shawnee Mission USD 512 school district. The official school colors are black and gold and the school mascot is the Viking.

Shawnee Mission West is a member of the Kansas State High School Activities Association and offers a variety of sports programs. Athletic teams compete in the 6A division and are known as the "Vikings". Extracurricular activities are also offered in the form of performing arts, school publications, and clubs.

History
Shawnee Mission West was established in 1962 due to the increasing numbers of students from the Overland Park, Kansas area. Prior to its creation, the Shawnee Mission School District included Shawnee Mission North High School (the original Shawnee Mission High School) and Shawnee Mission East High School.  Students from North and East were given the opportunity to transfer to the new high school if they lived within the boundaries of the new high school. Since then, it has been remodeled several times. Additions have also been made to the school, the most famous of which is "the bridge," an actual bridge between halves of the school that later had classrooms added beneath it. The bridge now serves as a social and dining area for the students.

Academics

The school was identified as a Blue Ribbon School in 1983. The Blue Ribbon Award recognizes public and private schools which perform at high levels or have made significant academic improvements. The former principal, Dr. Karl Krawitz, was named the NEA III District Educator of the Year for 2004–2005. Shawnee Mission West is home to both an award-winning school newspaper, the EPIC, and yearbook, SAGA.

Student demographics
Shawnee Mission West's student body population is 16% African-American, which is the highest percentage of African-American students at any Johnson County high school. Statistically, Shawnee Mission West is also the most ethnically diverse high school in the county, as 43% of its students are non-Caucasian. Shawnee Mission West draws its student population from both Overland Park, Lenexa, and from a small portion of Shawnee.

Extracurricular activities
The Vikings compete in the Sunflower League and are classified as a 6A school, the largest classification in Kansas according to the Kansas State High School Activities Association. Throughout its history, Shawnee Mission West has won several state championships in various sports. Many graduates have gone on to participate in Division I, Division II, and Division III athletics.

Athletics

Football
Shawnee Mission West's football program has appeared in eight state championship games, winning in 1972, 1985 and 2012, and losing in 1971, 1973, 1976, 1983 and 2006. Notable coaches include two Greater Kansas City Football Coaches Association Hall of Famers in Dick Purdy (1967-1980), and Harold Wambsgans (1981-1990).

Football state championship appearances and results

Boys' basketball
The boys' basketball program has made state championship game appearances in 1987, 1992, 1999 and 2005, however they have never won a state title.

Girls' soccer
The Viking girls' soccer program has made four state championship appearances since 2005, capturing a state title in 2016, and finishing as runner-up in 2005, 2006, and 2011.

Tennis
In recent years, the girls' tennis team has taken the region by storm. In 2006, the girls' won the Sunflower League, which had been largely dominated by Shawnee Mission East for the past eight years. In both 2006 and 2007, the team turned out a state doubles runner-up title. In 2014, the team got 2nd place at the Sunflower League tournament Katherine and Josephine Cao won the doubles State Championship.

Other sports
West has competed in four state title games for basketball, the most recent being in 2005, but has never won a championship. The Shawnee Mission West baseball team also has enjoyed their fair share of success, winning state championships in 1977, 1987, and 1988. In 1991, West's soccer team won the 6A state title, defeating two USA Today nationally ranked teams in the process: (Wichita South High School and Shawnee Mission South). Also, the Shawnee Mission West girls' soccer team was 2005 and 2006 Sunflower League champions; 2005 and 2006 Northeast Kansas 6A regional champions; 2005 and 2006 Kansas 6A state quarter-finalist; 2005 and 2006 Kansas 6A state runners-up. In 2016 the girls' soccer team won the Kansas 6A state championship, the Olathe Northwest Invitational Tournament, and the Sunflower League; ending the season with 20 wins, 0 losses, and 1 tie. The girls' soccer team ended the season nationally ranked; sixth by Top Drawer Soccer and ninth by the NSCAA. This was the first state championship for the school in girls' soccer.

State championships

Music department
The Shawnee Mission West marching band has been invited to play in London for the New Years Parade every three years for the past 27 years.  They hold the record for most appearances by a marching band from the United States of America. The Wind Ensemble was selected through audition to perform at the Kansas Music Educators Convention in February 2012. There were only three high school bands selected from across the state of Kansas for the prestigious honor. It has been 15 years since a band from Shawnee Mission West High School has been selected to perform at this event.

At the end of the regular football season, the Shawnee Mission West marching band has a light show where the band straps glow-sticks and flashlights to themselves. This show is performed each year at the end of the last home football game of the regular season.

The Choral Department comprises four choirs: Bel Canto (Women's Select Choir), Chorale, Concert Choir (freshman) and the Madrigal Singers (a chamber choir of 24 to 30 students). Madrigals members are generally required to be enrolled in Chorale, with few exceptions. The Madrigal Singers, the school's premiere ensemble, was selected to represent West at Carnegie Hall in the 2006–07 school year and the Chorale was also in 2009–2010.

Notable alumni
 Bob Anderson, founder of Runner's World
 Jerry Bell, former professional football player, Tampa Bay Buccaneers
 Henri Childs, former professional football player in the Canadian Football League
 Aaron Coleman, politician, in Kansas House of Representatives. 
 Roy Foster, former professional football player, San Francisco 49ers, Miami Dolphins
 Matt Freije, former professional basketball player, New Orleans Hornets and Atlanta Hawks
 Jay Jeffrey, former college football and baseball player and coach
 John Lehr, actor, star of the TV show "10 Items or Less"
 Rob Neyer, author and ESPN.com baseball columnist
 Ande Parks, comic book artist/writer
 Paul Rudd,  actor
 Sally Stonecipher, first female United States Army helicopter pilot
 Jason Sudeikis, actor and former member of Saturday Night Live
 Sean Tevis, politician
 Steve Towle, former professional football player, Miami Dolphins
 Jason Wiles, actor/director

See also

 List of high schools in Kansas
 List of unified school districts in Kansas
Other high schools in Shawnee Mission USD 512 school district
 Shawnee Mission East High School in Prairie Village
 Shawnee Mission North High School in Overland Park
 Shawnee Mission Northwest High School in Shawnee
 Shawnee Mission South High School in Overland Park
 Horizons High School in Mission, Kansas

References

External links
 

Educational institutions established in 1962
Public high schools in Kansas
Education in Overland Park, Kansas
Schools in Johnson County, Kansas
1962 establishments in Kansas